Sir William John Sowden (26 April 1858 – 10 October 1943) was a journalist in South Australia, who was knighted in 1918.

History
Sowden was born in Castlemaine, Victoria, the son of Thomas Sowden (c. 1832 – 3 May 1888), a miner from Cornwall, and his wife Mary Ann, née Hocking. They spent some years in Kapunda, South Australia, where vast quantities of copper ore were being extracted, but by 1867 had returned to Castlemaine where he completed his schooling and started in the newspaper trade. In 1874 they moved to Moonta, South Australia, another mining town, where William started work with the Yorke's Peninsula Advertiser, then in 1879 transferred to the Port Adelaide News (both owned by E. H. Derrington, whose feuds with Ebenezer Ward were legendary). In 1881 he started working for the South Australian Register, and was selected to accompany a group of parliamentarians (J. Langdon Parsons, H. E. Bright, L. L. Furner, J. H. Bagster), Professor Ralph Tate and others, to the Northern Territory on the Menmuir (Captain Ellis) as a representative of the Register. On his return he was given a position on the reporting staff and became chief leader writer in 1892. From 1897 to 1899 he was acting editor, subsequently editor, remaining in that position until his retirement in September 1922. He became part-owner of the Register in 1899.

He wrote, as "A. Pencil", a regular satirical column as city correspondent for the Kapunda Herald, much as C. R. Wilton, as "Autolycus", wrote for the Mount Barker Courier. He also wrote, as "A. Scribbler", a regular column "Echoes from the Smoking Room" for the Register.

He retired around 1925 to "Castlemaine", the house designed by  architect Henry Ernest Fuller in  Victor Harbor, where he died.

Recognition
He was knighted in 1918.

Bibliography
In addition to his journalistic work, Sir William wrote numerous books:

Other interests
Sir William was:
from 1908 president of the Board of Governors of the Public Library, Art Gallery and Museum. His interference with the hanging of works in the Art Gallery prompted the curator Henri Van Raalte in 1926 to resign (and to die from a self-inflicted gunshot wound a few years later).
actively associated with the South Australian Institute for 17 years
founder and first president of the SA branch of the Wattle Day League
the first president of the South Australian Soldiers' Fund, the Returned Soldiers' Association and the Cheer-Up Society. He was for 19 years president of Violet Memory Day (originally Violet Day), an initiative of the "Cheer-Ups"
president of the South Australian board of the Australian Natives' Association for five years. Founded short-lived Wattle Blossom Day in 1890.
active in the Scout movement; during the absence of the State Governor from Adelaide, he was Acting Chief Scout for South Australia
first Federal president of the Australian Wattle Day League and State president of the League's South Australian Branch
founder of the Royal Society of St. George, and for a time president
founder of four Masonic lodges, and Master of three
active supporter of The Overseas League, the Prisoners' Aid Society, the Sick Poor Fund, the Christmas Cheer Fund
member of the Geographical Society and the Chamber of Commerce
from 1937 a member of the Adelaide Club.

Sir William, who made several extensive tours abroad, was present in Westminster Abbey for the coronation of King George VI. He led a press delegation to England, accompanied by Sir James Fairfax.
In 1918 he visited the battlefields of Europe as guest of the Imperial Government.

His forthright manner and outgoing personality won for him many admirers, but also many enemies, among them Sir Samuel Way.

Family
He married Letitia Grace "Letty" Adams (? – 9 April 1928) of "Corio", Oakleigh, Victoria on 28 April 1886; they had two sons.

He married again, to Margaret Ella Suttie of Mosman, New South Wales on 2 April 1929.

References 

Australian newspaper editors
Australian newspaper proprietors
19th-century Australian journalists
19th-century Australian male writers
1858 births
1943 deaths
Adelaide Club
19th-century male writers
People from Castlemaine, Victoria
Australian male journalists